is a Japanese Professional baseball Catcher for the Fukuoka SoftBank Hawks of Nippon Professional Baseball.

Early baseball career
Kuki participated in the 3rd grade spring 88th Japanese High School Baseball Invitational Tournament and the 3rd grade summer 98th Japanese High School Baseball Championship as a captain, with Fumimaru Taura, who was lower than the first grade, and a battery at the Syugakukan High School. In 2016, Kuki was selected as the Japan national baseball team in the 2016 Asian Junior Baseball Championship. And he contributed to the team's victory as captain, and was honored with an Excellent Defensive Player Award.

Professional career
On October 20, 2016, Kuki was drafted by the Fukuoka Softbank Hawks in the 2016 Nippon Professional Baseball draft.

In 2017-2018 season, he played in the Western League of NPB's minor leagues and played in informal matches against Shikoku Island League Plus's teams. On April 3, 2018, he injured his right thumb and operated.

On May 26, 2019, Kuki debuted as a Pinch hitter against Chiba Lotte Marines and recorded a Hit by pitch. And he was selected as the Japan Series roster in the 2019 Japan Series.

In the match against the Hokkaido Nippon-Ham Fighters on July 5, 2020, Kuki participated as a starter and recorded his first hit in the Pacific League with a home run. However, on September 30, he had surgery on the cervical spine, so he played only five games in the Pacific League for the 2020 season.

In 2021 season, he spent the first half of the season on a rehab assignment, was registered for the first league on June 18, and recorded a hit in a July 7 game against the Chiba Lotte Marines.

In 2022 season, he never had a chance to play in the first league.

Personal
Kuki Yoshitaka, the commander of the Kuki Suigun (Kuki Navy) during the Sengoku period, is his ancestor.

References

External links

Career statistics - NPB.jp
65 Ryuhei Kuki PLAYERS2022 - Fukuoka SoftBank Hawks Official site

1998 births
Living people
Fukuoka SoftBank Hawks players
Japanese baseball players
Nippon Professional Baseball catchers
Baseball people from Osaka Prefecture